Sean Tiedeman (born November 17, 1972) is an American film director, producer, musician, and actor.

Biography 
Tiedeman was raised in Phillipsburg, New Jersey and after finishing high school he graduated from Northampton Community College in Bethlehem, Pennsylvania.  Tiedeman formed K Studios in 1997 with his college classmate, Scott Krycia.  In May 2005, The Eastern Pennsylvania Business Journal named Tiedeman in the top 20 of the region's business leaders under the age of 40.

Filmography

Director 
 Flying Spiders (2021)
 The King of Arcades (2014)
 The Making of Bereavement (2010) - Anchor Bay Entertainment
 Eavesdrop: A Conversation with Writer/Director Matthew Miele (2010) - Osiris Entertainment
 The Making of Brutal Massacre: A Comedy (2008) - Anchor Bay Entertainment
 Hell's Half Acre (2006) - Blackplague Films
 The Stage (2003-2013) - A Telly Award-winning regional television program airing on Service Electric Cable TV and Blue Ridge Communications.
 Pop TV (2001-2003) - Service Electric Cable TV, Blue Ridge Communications
 The Best of Chiller Theatre (1998) - K Studios

Producer 
 RoboDoc: The Creation of Robocop (2023) - Executive Producer/Dead Mouse Productions
 Sorority Babes in the Slimeball Bowl-O-Rama 2 (2022) - Associate Producer/Full Moon Features
 Pennywise: The Story of 'IT''' (2022) - Associate Producer/Dead Mouse Productions
 Killer: Malevolence 3 (2018) - Associate Producer
 Power of Grayskull: The Definitive History of He-Man and the Masters of the Universe (2017) - Associate Producer
 Plank Face (2016) - Executive Producer/Bandit Motion Pictures
 You're So Cool Brewster! The Story of Fright Night (2016) - Associate Producer/Dead Mouse Productions
 Passfire (2016) - Associate Producer/Veverka Bros.
 Back in Time (2015 film) - Associate Producer/Gravitas Ventures
 Leviathan: The Story of Hellraiser and Hellbound: Hellraiser II (2015) - Associate Producer/Cult Film Screenings
 The King of Arcades (2014) - Producer/Tiedebaby Films
 Trophy Heads (2014) - (2014) Executive Producer/Full Moon Features
 Thankskilling 3 (2012) - Executive Producer/Detention Films
 Making of Bereavement (2011) - Producer/Anchor Bay Entertainment
 Gingerdead Man 3: Saturday Night Cleaver (2011) - Executive Producer/Echo Bridge Home Entertainment
 Monsterpiece Theatre Volume 1 (2011) - Co-Executive Producer
 China: The Rebirth of an Empire (2010) - Associate Producer/Veverka Bros. Productions
 Eavesdrop (2008) - Associate Producer/Shoreline Entertainment/Osiris Entertainment
 Gingerdead Man 2: Passion of the Crust (2008) - 'Honorary' Executive Producer/Full Moon Features
 Hell's Half Acre (2006) - Producer/Blackplague Films
 Evil Bong (2006) - Associate Producer/Full Moon Features
 Everything's Jake (2000) - Associate Producer/Warner Bros.

Actor 
 Brutal Massacre: A Comedy (2008) - Popcorn Clerk/Look Out Clown/Anchor Bay Entertainment
 Red Lips (1995) - Directed by Donald Farmer

Camera & Electrical Department 
 Killer: Malevolence 3 (2018) - Grip & Electric Swing
 30 Years of Garbage: The Garbage Pail Kids Story (2016) - Cinematographer
 Man vs Snake (2016) - Additional Footage Provided by
 Bereavement (2010) - Grip, Video, & Electric Swing
100 Scariest Movie Moments (2004) - Camera Operator: interview segments/Bravo (US TV channel)

Editor 
 The Badlees: Renew and Rewind (TV Movie) (2002)
 Hell's Half Acre (2006) - Blackplague Films
 Iron City Asskickers (TV Pilot Directed by George A. Romero) (1998)

Miscellaneous Crew 

 Romantic Mysticism: The Music of Billy Goldenberg (2022) - Titles/Graphics Manager
 In Search of Darkness (2019) - Blu-ray and DVD Authoring
 Killer: Malevolence 3 (2018) - Locations
 Bereavement (2010) - set dresser: second unit

Special Thanks 
Hardcore Henry (2015) - STX Entertainment
Grace: Delivered (2009) - Anchor Bay Entertainment
Evil Bong - Full Moon Features (2006)

Feature Film Directing Career

Flying Spiders (2021) 
When flying spiders wreak havoc on a small town, it's up to the locals to contain them before the airborne arachnids take over the world.

The King of Arcades (2014) 
Follow the rise and fall of the King of Arcades as one man pursues his dream against all odds.
The King of Arcades was one of the featured titles on the initial launch of GOG.com's DRM-free movie platform.

Hell's Half Acre (2006 film) 
A serial killer is brought to justice by his victims and burned alive on what is now known as Hell's Half Acre. Years later, a faceless killer begins slaughtering the townspeople. Losing her friends and family, Nicole Becker (Tesia Nicoli) decides to go after the killer with all she's got. Double machetes, shotguns, dual handguns, and even a chain gun are all part of this killer's arsenal. Needless to say, it's gonna be messy.

Music 
Tiedeman writes, records, and performs novelty songs under the stage name of Irish Elvis.  His song, 80's Arcade, has aired on several syndicated radio shows including Dr. Demento.
80's Arcade also received airplay on Manic Mondays hosted by Tom "Devo Spice" Rockwell of the comedy rap trio Sudden Death and became the #3 most requested new song of 2005 on Captain Wayne's Mad Music Hour. Tiedeman was also Executive Producer of Danny Weinkauf's children's album No School Today released by Megaforce Records/April 2014.

External links 
Sean Tiedeman's Official Website

K Studios Official Website
Eastern Pennsylvania Business Journal Profile
The Morning Call UNREELING A NEW ARTS VENUE
2005 Making It Big! NCC magazine article
Beyond The Gray: From a Childhood Dream to the Big Screen
Hell's Half Acre Official Web Page
Hell's Half Acre Official Myspace Page
 THE ALLENTOWN TIMES Cover Story on Hell's Half Acre
Hell's Half Acre review from SYNERGY MAGAZINE
Eavesdrop Official Web Page
Everything's Jake Official Movie Site
Brutal Massacre: A Comedy Official Web Page
POCONO RECORD Hell's Half Acre/Sherman Theater article

References

1972 births
American film directors
Living people